Virgil van Dijk (born 8 July 1991) is a Dutch professional footballer who plays as a centre-back for  club Liverpool and the Netherlands national team. Considered one of the best defenders in the world, Van Dijk is known for his strength, leadership and aerial ability.

After beginning his professional career with Groningen, Van Dijk moved to Celtic in 2013. With Celtic he won the Scottish Premiership and was named in the PFA Scotland Team of the Year in both of his seasons with the club, and won the Scottish League Cup in the second. In 2015, he joined Southampton before signing for Liverpool in January 2018 for £75 million, a then-world-record transfer fee for a defender. With Liverpool, Van Dijk reached back-to-back UEFA Champions League finals in 2018 and 2019, winning the latter. He was also named PFA Players' Player of the Year and the Premier League Player of the Season in his first full season. Van Dijk later won the FIFA Club World Cup and UEFA Super Cup, and helped end the club's 30-year league title drought by winning the 2019–20 Premier League. He is the only defender to win the UEFA Men's Player of the Year Award, and has finished runner-up for both the Ballon d'Or and Best FIFA Men's Player, all in 2019.

Van Dijk represented the Netherlands at under-19 and under-21 levels. He made his senior international debut for the Netherlands in 2015 and assumed full captaincy of the national team in March 2018. The following year, Van Dijk captained the Netherlands to the final of the inaugural UEFA Nations League, where they finished runners-up. He also represented the side at the 2022 FIFA World Cup.

Early life
Van Dijk was born in Breda to a Dutch father and a Surinamese mother. Growing up he would play football wherever he could – on the streets, in concrete cages, and eventually Saturday morning matches. He combined his time playing at the Willem II academy with a part-time job as a dishwasher. Having previously and unsuccessfully featured as a right-back, Van Dijk was shifted into a central defensive position in 2008, aged 17, after he grew in height by around 18 centimetres. Despite the positional shift and Van Dijk's physical growth, Willem II's reserve manager at the time Edwin Hermans believed he had "too many limitations" which prevented him from breaking into the first team. In 2010, he was scouted by former Dutch international Martin Koeman, who was working for FC Groningen at the time, and he ended up completing a free transfer to the club in the same year.

Club career

Groningen
Van Dijk initially struggled to break into Groningen's first team with club staff believing he was "overtired" after extensive playing time with Willem II's academy and reserve sides. He made his professional debut for the club on 1 May 2011, coming on as a 72nd-minute substitute for Petter Andersson during a 4–2 victory against ADO Den Haag. On 29 May, and against the same opposition, he made his first start for Groningen and scored his first professional goals, netting twice in a 5–1 win in a UEFA Europa League play-off match.

During the 2011–12 Eredivisie season, Van Dijk made 23 league appearances for the Eredivisie team, and scored his first regular-season goal during the club's 6–0 victory over Feyenoord on 30 October 2011. He suffered a personal setback during the campaign, however, as soon after his 20th birthday he was admitted to hospital with peritonitis and kidney poisoning. Van Dijk later revealed that he had been close to dying as a result of the medical emergency and that the hospital had even gone so far as to ask him to sign a "sort of will" in the event of his passing.

He did, however, return to Groningen and continued to impress the following season. At the end of the campaign, and with Van Dijk having "outgrown" the club, he was offered to a number of bigger Eredivisie clubs, including Ajax, all of which elected not to sign him.

Celtic

2013–14 season
On 21 June 2013, Van Dijk signed with Celtic for a fee of around £2.6 million, on a four-year deal including a 10% selling-on fee for Groningen. He made his debut on 17 August, replacing Efe Ambrose for the final 13 minutes of a 2–0 Scottish Premiership win over Aberdeen at Pittodrie Stadium. A week later, he made his first start, in a 2–2 draw with Inverness Caledonian Thistle at Celtic Park. On 9 November, Van Dijk scored his first Celtic goals, heading one in each half of a 4–1 win against Ross County. After a solo run, he scored the only goal of a victory over St Johnstone on 26 December.

Van Dijk scored again on 26 January 2014, in a 4–0 win versus Hibernian for Celtic's 11th consecutive league win. On 25 February, he was sent off after 13 minutes of an eventual 2–1 loss at Aberdeen, for a professional foul on Peter Pawlett; it was Celtic's first defeat of the season. With Celtic having already won the league, Van Dijk netted again on 7 May to put his team 3–1 up away to St Johnstone, in an eventual 3–3 draw. He was one of three Celtic players named in the PFA Scotland Team of the Year. Van Dijk was nominated for the PFA Scotland Players' Player of the Year award, but lost out to fellow Celtic player Kris Commons.

2014–15 season

On 22 July 2014, Van Dijk and Teemu Pukki each scored twice in a 4–0 home win over KR in a UEFA Champions League qualifier, putting their team into the next round 5–0 on aggregate. His first goal of the Premiership season came on 9 November, finishing from Stefan Johansen's last-minute corner for a 2–1 win at Aberdeen. Three weeks later, Van Dijk scored the first and last goals of Celtic's 4–0 win versus Heart of Midlothian in the fourth round of the Scottish Cup. Four days after that, his sixth goal of the season was enough for victory in a home match against Glasgow neighbours Partick Thistle.

Van Dijk was again on target on 21 January 2015, opening a 4–0 home win over Motherwell. On 26 February, he was sent off in the 36th minute against Inter Milan for a foul on Mauro Icardi, as Celtic lost 1–0 on the night, 4–3 on aggregate in the last 32 of the UEFA Europa League. He was again sent off on 8 March in the Cup quarter-final away to Dundee United at Tannadice Park, receiving a red card after eleven minutes for a confrontation with Calum Butcher. His suspension for the following week's Scottish League Cup Final was overturned on appeal, as was that of Paul Paton, who was sent off when mistaken for Butcher. Van Dijk played the full 90 minutes of the final at Hampden Park, which Celtic won 2–0. On 18 March, Celtic's third consecutive match against Dundee United, Van Dijk scored in the last minute to confirm a 4–0 win in a Cup replay.

On 19 April, Celtic contested the Cup semi-final against Inverness at Hampden, and Van Dijk opened the scoring with a free kick. After the dismissal of goalkeeper Craig Gordon, Celtic fell 3–2, ending their chance of a treble. Three days later, again from a free kick, he confirmed a 2–1 win away to Dundee. His team again won the league, and Van Dijk was included in the league's Team of the Season for the second consecutive campaign. He was again shortlisted for the PFA Scotland Players' Player award, but lost out to another teammate, this time Stefan Johansen.

Van Dijk was reportedly "considering his future" in Glasgow after Celtic were knocked out of the 2015–16 UEFA Champions League in the qualifying rounds to Malmö of Sweden.

Southampton

2015–16 season
On 1 September 2015, Van Dijk signed a five-year contract with Premier League club Southampton, managed by Ronald Koeman, for a reported £13 million transfer fee.

He made his debut for Southampton on 12 September in a 0–0 draw against West Bromwich Albion at The Hawthorns. Two weeks later, Van Dijk marked his third Premier League appearance with his first goal for the club, which came in the form of a header in the 11th minute to put Southampton in front, following a set-piece from James Ward-Prowse in a 3–1 home win over Swansea City. On 7 May 2016, Van Dijk signed a new six-year contract with the Saints.

2016–17 season
On 22 January 2017, he was named team captain of Southampton, after the departure of José Fonte. On the same day, he suffered an ankle injury against Leicester City. This ruled him out of the 2017 EFL Cup Final, which Southampton lost to Manchester United at Wembley Stadium.

After a successful 2016–17 season at Southampton, Van Dijk was subject to interest from Liverpool, who apologised to Southampton for an illegal approach for the player after having reportedly made clear his interest in a move to Liverpool. On 7 August 2017, Van Dijk handed in a transfer request to Southampton and released a statement along with it, emphasising his wish to join a different club in the transfer window.

2017–18 season
Van Dijk remained with Southampton for the start of the 2017–18 season and made his first appearance since being injured in January, coming on as a late substitute in a 1–0 victory at Crystal Palace on 26 September. He made what turned out to be his final appearance for Southampton on 13 December 2017, in a 4–1 home defeat to Leicester. It was also his last appearance in any of Southampton's matchday squads, as he was omitted from the squad for the rest of his tenure at the club in light of speculation surrounding his future.

Liverpool

2017–18 season

On 27 December 2017, it was announced that Van Dijk would join Liverpool when the winter transfer window opened on 1 January 2018 for a reported fee of £75 million. Former club Celtic would receive 10% of Van Dijk's transfer fee, due to a sell-on clause placed in his Southampton contract. Southampton claimed the undisclosed transfer fee would constitute a world record fee in football for a defender.

He made his debut for Liverpool on 5 January in the third round of the FA Cup and scored the winning goal with a late header in a 2–1 victory against local rivals Everton. In doing so, he became the first player since Bill White in 1901 to score on his debut in the Merseyside derby. Van Dijk and Dejan Lovren built a strong partnership at the heart of Liverpool's defence, with the Dutchman being credited for improving Liverpool's previous defensive issues.

Van Dijk was included in the UEFA Champions League Squad of the Season, despite playing just half of the season in the Champions League, with the UEFA Technical Observers saying: "Van Dijk arrived at Anfield and provided composure and stability in the competition's knockout stages." Van Dijk played the full 90 minutes in the 2018 UEFA Champions League Final against Real Madrid, which Liverpool lost 1–3. Van Dijk played 22 games in all competitions in his first season with the club, scoring once.

2018–19 season
On 20 August 2018, Van Dijk was voted man of the match by BBC Sport and Sky Sports for his performance in a 2–0 win over Crystal Palace. Van Dijk received the Liverpool Player of the Month award for his performances in August. On 2 December, Van Dijk was awarded an assist for the winning goal in a derby match against city rivals Everton. Liverpool won 1–0 thanks to Divock Origi's 96th-minute goal, set up by a Van Dijk volley and a subsequent error from Everton goalkeeper Jordan Pickford. The Dutchman was ultimately awarded the PFA Player of the Month for November 2018. On 21 December, Van Dijk scored his first goal in the Premier League for Liverpool in a 2–0 away win against Wolverhampton Wanderers. The Dutchman continued his impressive form in the 2018–19 season by winning the Premier League Player of the Month prize for December 2018.

On 27 February 2019, Van Dijk scored twice in a 5–0 win against Watford. The following month, he scored once - his first goal in the Champions League for the club - and assisted another in a 3–1 win over Bayern Munich. In doing so, he became the first player since Craig Bellamy in 2007 to score and assist a goal for Liverpool in a knock-out stage match away from home in the competition.

On 20 April, he was one of six players nominated for the PFA Players' Player of the Year award alongside teammate Sadio Mané. Four days later, he was named in the PFA Team of the Year alongside Liverpool teammates, Trent Alexander-Arnold, Mané and Andrew Robertson. On 28 April 2019, he was named the PFA Players' Player of the Year. Following Liverpool's 2–0 victory over Tottenham in the 2019 UEFA Champions League Final on 1 June, Van Dijk was named UEFA's man of the match.

2019–20 season

In August 2019, Van Dijk won the UEFA Men's Player of the Year Award. On 2 September 2019, he was shortlisted in the final three of the best FIFA football awards. On 23 September 2019, he was voted runner up in The Best FIFA Men's Player and into the FIFA FIFpro Men's World 11. In October 2019, Van Dijk was shortlisted as one in 30 football players for the Ballon d'Or. At the event in December, he finished runner-up behind Lionel Messi. On 21 December 2019, after missing the semi-final of the 2019 FIFA Club World Cup with illness, Van Dijk played in the final against Flamengo with Liverpool winning the trophy for the first time in the club’s history.

Van Dijk received further recognition following the turn of the year, when he was named in the 2019 UEFA Team of the Year. On 19 January 2020, Van Dijk scored his first North-West Derby goal against Manchester United in Liverpool’s 2–0 win at Anfield in the Premier League.

Over the course of the 2019–20 domestic campaign, Van Dijk started and completed every minute for Liverpool.

2020–21 season
On 12 September 2020, Van Dijk scored a headed goal against Leeds United on the opening day of the new season.

On 17 October, he was substituted in the sixth minute of the Merseyside derby after a challenge from Everton goalkeeper Jordan Pickford. On the following day, it was announced that he had suffered an ACL injury in his right knee and would undergo surgery. Van Dijk was expected to be out from six to twelve months. On 30 October it was announced that the surgery on his injuries had been successful. Dutch national team coach Frank de Boer had hoped that Van Dijk would be able to make his return before UEFA Euro 2020, Van Dijk however decided that he should continue his rehabilitation so he could start the next season fully fit.

2021–22 season
Van Dijk made his first appearance in over nine months on 29 July 2021, coming on as a second-half substitute in a pre-season friendly against Hertha BSC. On 13 August 2021, Van Dijk signed a new four-year contract, keeping him at the club until 2025. His first goal for Liverpool in over 14 months came against his former club Southampton, when he hit a volley from a corner.

2022–23 season 
On 29 October 2022, Liverpool lost 2–1 at home to Leeds United which was Van Dijk's first home defeat at Anfield in the Premier League after 70 games since joining the club in January 2018.

International career
Van Dijk made his full international debut for Netherlands on 10 October 2015, in a 2–1 victory away from home against Kazakhstan in a UEFA Euro 2016 qualifier.

He was awarded the captaincy of his country by manager Ronald Koeman on 22 March 2018, and his first match as captain was a 1–0 home friendly defeat by England the next day. On 26 March, he scored his first international goal to conclude a 3–0 win over European champions Portugal at the Stade de Genève. On 13 October, he scored in a 3–0 win over 2014 World Cup champions Germany in the UEFA Nations League. More importantly, he scored the equaliser in the next match with Germany, after assistant coach Dwight Lodeweges sent him a small paper note during a break, with the request to play forward in the last minutes of the game. The goal enabled the Netherlands to win the group phase of the Nations League. He later captained his country to the final which they lost 1–0 against Portugal.

In May 2021, Van Dijk ruled himself out of playing in the postponed UEFA Euro 2020 to have enough time to recover after a long-term injury since October 2020.

In November 2022, Van Dijk was announced as the Dutch captain for the 2022 FIFA World Cup. He led his team to the top of the group stage with wins over Senegal and hosts Qatar. Van Dijk then led his team to the quarter finals where they lost on penalties to Lionel Messi‘s Argentina who later won the tournament.

Style of play
Van Dijk is a physically strong, right-footed centre-back, who usually features on the left-hand side of central defence, although he can also play as a right-sided centre-back. He is gifted with pace, good technique, and an eye for goal, and is an effective set-piece taker. Regarding his ability, former Celtic teammate Kris Commons commented that Van Dijk was "comfortable on the ball", also noting that "He had good technique and a wonderful right foot. He was good on set-pieces, some of the free-kicks he scored for Celtic are absolute wonders. He could read the game well. He had an aura about him, a confidence, because I think he knew he was good."

Neil McGuinness, senior scout at Celtic when Van Dijk was signed, called him "everything you would want if you could create a profile of the ideal central defender", praising him as a "very smooth ball-playing defender" who possesses aerial prowess, skills from dead ball situations, and "strong leadership qualities", while commenting that since his move to England, he is "more tactically aware now [...] his anticipation and timing has improved and he is a lot more of an all-rounder". McGuinness believes Van Dijk's "biggest problem" is that he "can switch off when the game is comfortable". In 2018, Steve Douglas of The Globe and Mail described Van Dijk with the following words: "Powerful in the air, measured with the ball at his feet, quick, and with superb positional sense, van Dijk [sic] has it all." Dario Pergolizzi also described Van Dijk as a good marker in 2019.

In a 2019 interview with Marca, when Lionel Messi was asked why Van Dijk was so difficult to beat, the Argentine responded: "He is a defender who knows how to judge his timing and wait for the right moment to challenge or jockey [the attacker]. He is very fast and big, but he has a lot of agility for his height. He is fast because of its [sic] great stride, and he is impressive both in defence and attack because he scores lots of goals." That same year, Paul Merson described Van Dijk as "the best in the world, and I think by a long way, as a defensive centre-half."

In 2022, Erling Haaland named Van Dijk the best defender he has played against, calling him "fast, strong and 'bad' smart", as well as praising his timing.

Sponsorship
Van Dijk features as the cover star of the champions edition of EA Sports' FIFA video game FIFA 20. He is endorsed by sportswear company Nike.

Personal life
Van Dijk commonly uses only his first name on the kit. According to his uncle Steven, this is because of a family feud with his father, Ron van Dijk, who abandoned his family during Virgil's childhood. Virgil is married to childhood sweetheart, Rike Nooitgedagt, and they have four children. Van Dijk has Chinese ancestry. Hellen Fo Sieeuw, his mother, is of part-Chinese descent. The Chinese surname 'Fo Sieeuw' derives from the given name of his maternal great-grandfather, Chin Fo Sieeuw (陈火秀), who emigrated from Guangdong to Suriname around 1920.

Career statistics

Club

International

Netherlands score listed first, score column indicates score after each Van Dijk goal.

Honours
Celtic
Scottish Premiership: 2013–14, 2014–15
Scottish League Cup: 2014–15

Liverpool
Premier League: 2019–20
FA Cup: 2021–22
EFL Cup: 2021–22
FA Community Shield: 2022
UEFA Champions League: 2018–19; runner-up: 2017–18, 2021–22
UEFA Super Cup: 2019
FIFA Club World Cup: 2019

Netherlands
UEFA Nations League runner-up: 2018–19

Individual
PFA Players' Player of the Year: 2018–19
PFA Team of the Year: 2018–19 Premier League, 2019–20 Premier League, 2021–22 Premier League
PFA Player of the Month: November 2018
Premier League Player of the Season: 2018–19
Premier League Player of the Month: December 2018
Alan Hardaker Trophy: 2022
UEFA Men's Player of the Year Award: 2018–19
UEFA Champions League Defender of the Season: 2018–19
UEFA Team of the Year: 2018, 2019, 2020
UEFA Champions League Squad of the Season: 2017–18, 2018–19, 2019–20
UEFA Champions League Team of the Season: 2021–22
UEFA Nations League Finals Team of the Tournament: 2019
Liverpool Fans' Player of the Season Award: 2018–19
Liverpool Players' Player of the Season Award: 2018–19
Southampton Player of the Season: 2015–16
PFA Scotland Team of the Year: 2013–14, 2014–15
Celtic Players' Player of the Year: 2013–14
FIFA FIFPRO World 11: 2019, 2020, 2022
IFFHS Men's World Team: 2019, 2020, 2022
IFFHS World Team of the Decade: 2011–2020
IFFHS UEFA Team of the Decade: 2011–2020
ESM Team of the Year: 2018–19, 2019–20, 2021–22
Football Supporters' Federation Player of the Year: 2019

References

External links

Profile at the Liverpool F.C. website

1991 births
Living people
Footballers from Breda
Dutch footballers
Association football defenders
Willem II (football club) players
FC Groningen players
Celtic F.C. players
Southampton F.C. players
Liverpool F.C. players
Eredivisie players
Scottish Professional Football League players
Premier League players
FA Cup Final players
UEFA Champions League winning players
UEFA Men's Player of the Year Award winners
Netherlands youth international footballers
Netherlands under-21 international footballers
Netherlands international footballers
2022 FIFA World Cup players
Dutch expatriate footballers
Expatriate footballers in England
Expatriate footballers in Scotland
Dutch expatriate sportspeople in England
Dutch expatriate sportspeople in Scotland
Dutch sportspeople of Surinamese descent
Dutch people of Chinese descent